Berlenti Abdel Hamid (  ) (20 November 19351 December 2010), born Nefisa Abdel-Hamid Hawass (Egyptian Arabic: نفيسة عبدالحميد حواس), was an icon of Egyptian cinema's golden age. She is known for her roles as a "temptress". She married Abdel Hakim Amer, the first vice-president of the former Egyptian President Gamal Abdel Nasser.

Death 
Abdel Hamid died in the Armed Forces Hospital after suffering a stroke.

References 

Egyptian film actresses
1935 births
2010 deaths
People from Beni Suef Governorate